is a Japanese weightlifter and Olympic medalist. He received a bronze medal at the 1976 Summer Olympics in Montreal, Quebec, Canada.

References

External links
 
 

1950 births
Living people
Japanese male weightlifters
Olympic bronze medalists for Japan
Olympic medalists in weightlifting
Weightlifters at the 1972 Summer Olympics
Weightlifters at the 1976 Summer Olympics
Medalists at the 1976 Summer Olympics
Asian Games medalists in weightlifting
Asian Games gold medalists for Japan
Asian Games silver medalists for Japan
Weightlifters at the 1970 Asian Games
Weightlifters at the 1974 Asian Games
Medalists at the 1970 Asian Games
Medalists at the 1974 Asian Games
World Weightlifting Championships medalists
People from Gifu
Sportspeople from Gifu Prefecture
20th-century Japanese people
21st-century Japanese people